"Lass Uns Laufen" (lit. "Let's Run") and "World Behind My Wall" are the second singles from German pop rock band Tokio Hotel's third German studio album and second English studio album Humanoid. "Lass Uns Laufen" was released in German-speaking countries on 22 January 2010 and "World Behind My Wall" was released in the United States on January 8, 2010.

Track listing

+ Lass uns laufen (Music Video)

Release history

Charts

References

Tokio Hotel songs
2010 singles
Songs written by Guy Chambers
Rock ballads
Songs written by David Jost
Songs written by Bill Kaulitz
Songs written by Tom Kaulitz
2009 songs